Sharon Doorson (born 24 April 1987, Netherlands) is a Dutch singer-songwriter, of Surinamese descent. She released her debut album in 2013, which reached the top 20 with 4 Top 40 singles released so far in Netherlands. She competed in The Voice of Holland  having all four judges turn for her in the Blind-Audition. She was eliminated in Week 6 (the semi-finals).

Early years 
When Doorson was six years old, she won a playback show. In 2004 she was in a girl band, called Raffish (with Eva Simons). Raffish had a No. 1 hit in the Netherlands. The girlband separated ways in 2006, because all the girls wanted to go solo.

Career 
In 2011, Doorson participated in the Dutch TV program The Voice of Holland. In 2012, she released her first single, "Fail in Love". In 2013 she released her second single, high on your love (she got a Number 1 hit in Poland with this song), her third single, "Killer", which is also the title of her debut album, her fourth single "can't live without you" with Mischa Daniels and her fifth single "Run Run". On 14 March she released her new single, "Louder".

In 2015, Doorson decided she wanted to go another musical way, more pop instead of dance. She released 2 singles, "Electrify" and "Something Beautiful". In 2016 she followed up with the catchy How You Like It. She also successfully introduced the song Hold me now.

In 2017 Sharon Doorson gained popularity on YouTube in Brazil and Vietnam.

Discography

Albums

Singles

As lead artists

As featured artists

Other appearances

Notes

References

1987 births
Living people
Dutch dance musicians
Dutch pop singers
Dutch people of Surinamese descent
English-language singers from the Netherlands
Musicians from Utrecht (city)
21st-century Dutch singers
21st-century Dutch women singers